The list of shipwrecks in 1950 includes ships sunk, foundered, grounded, or otherwise lost during 1950.

January

12 January

15 January

16 January

17 January

21 January

27 January

29 January

31 January

February

1 February

10 February

11 February

12 February

21 February

24 February

25 February

March

9 March

15 March

17 March

26 March

28 March

April

10 April

12 April

18 April

May

2 May

5 May

7 May

10 May

15 May

24 May

25 May

26 May

June

1 June

6 June

19 June

22 June

23 June

26 June

29 June

July

2 July

3 July

5 July

9 July

10 July

12 July

14 July

16 July

22 July

24 July

26 July

27 July

August

2 August

3 August

7 August

13 August

14 August

15 August

20 August

22 August

23 August

24 August

25 August

31 August

Unknown date

September

3 September

5 September

7 September

10 September

12 September

13 September

15 September

16 September

21 September

22 September

25 September

27 September

28 September

Unknown date

October

1 October

5 October

11 October

12 October

15 October

17 October

18 October

24 October

26 October

27 October

November

7 November

9 November

11 November

13 November

15 November

17 November

24 November

26 November

30 November

December

1 December

2 Deember

7 December

11 December

15 December

23 December

31 December

Unknown date

References 

1950
 
Ships